Lady Pank is the debut studio album by Polish pop rock band Lady Pank. It was released on June 20, 1983 in Poland through Tonpress (LP version), and been re-released by different record labels.

Lady Pank is considered to be one of the most important albums in the history of Polish rock.

Track listing

Bonus Tracks

Personnel
Jan Borysewicz – lead guitar, guitar, vocal, music 
Janusz Panasewicz – vocal
Edmund Stasiak – guitar
Paweł Mścisławski – bass guitar
Jarosław Szlagowski – drums
Andrzej Mogielnicki – lyrics
Mariusz Zabrodzki - co-producer, Moog syntheziser
Cezary Szlazak - saxophone
Aleksander Januszewski - artwork
Andrzej Karczewski - photography

Release history

References

1983 debut albums
Lady Pank albums